Cairo Community Unit School District 1 is a unified school district located in Cairo, Illinois, the county seat of Alexander County. It is composed of two schools: Cairo Elementary School, which educates primary to fifth graders; and Cairo Junior and Senior High School, which encompasses grades six through twelve. The district includes the southernmost parts of Alexander County, including the city of Cairo, and the unincorporated areas of Cache, Future City, Klondike, Miller City, and Urbandale. During the 2016–17 school year, the district's enrollment for all grades was 441.

It formerly operated Bennett Elementary School and Cairo Junior High School. In 2005 the former junior high became the Cairo Community Education Center, which has programs operated by the Regional Center for Education, which has a lease from the school district; then the center subleases it to various entities, including Southern Illinois University Carbondale. Bennett Elementary ended operations in 2010.

History
In 2003 it had 905 students. That year the district had financial and academic problems.

Demographics
Based on census estimates, the Cairo school district has the highest percentage in Illinois of children in poverty, 60.6%. This is the fifteenth highest percentage of any city in the United States.

Academic achievement
Circa 2010 the high school's average ACT test score was 15.

External links

References

Cairo, Illinois
Education in Alexander County, Illinois
School districts in Illinois